Yeshiva Bais Moshe (also referred to as Yeshivath Beth Moshe, Yeshiva Beth Moshe,  Scranton Yeshiva, or Milton Eisner Yeshiva High School), is a Haredi Jewish High School and Seminary (Yeshiva) in Scranton, Pennsylvania. It was founded in 1965 by its Roshei HaYeshiva (Deans) - Rabbi Chaim Bressler and Rabbi Yaakov Schnaidman, disciples of the late Rabbi Aaron Kotler, founder and Rosh HaYeshiva of Beth Medrash Govoha in Lakewood, New Jersey.

Yeshiva Bais Moshe is an all-male school. It comprises a high school and a collegiate-level seminary Beis Midrash. About 80 students between ages 14 and 18 attend the high school, while about 50 students between the ages of 19 and 23 attend the seminary. While some students are from the local Scranton Jewish community, a majority of students come from across the country to study Talmud at the Scranton Yeshiva. It is a well-known institution with an academically high-level of Talmudic study. While Rabbi Schnaidman and Rabbi Bressler are the principal and Rosh Yeshiva of both Bais Medrash and High School, Rabbi Schnaidman focuses more on the Bais Medrash while Rabbi Bressler focuses on the High School.

Curriculum 

The school teaches a challenging Talmudic curriculum, where classes and study sessions last from early morning until late in the evening and the school's calendar year lasts 11 months. The High School curriculum includes an accredited education with a focus on mathematics, science, language arts and history.  Applicants seeking to become students at Scranton Yeshiva must prepare and take an oral examination based on a passage from the Talmud given by two of the rabbeim. Most graduates continue their Talmudic studies at the finest Yeshivas in Israel and later at Beth Medrash Govoha, while a minority of them pursue professional degrees and other career oriented goals.

Campus 

The campus, located in the South Side of Scranton, has two buildings. The main building contains the Beis Midrash study and prayer hall, classrooms, dining area, library, and dormitory. The other building contains a dormitory and a local grocery store selling a variety of kosher food products. 

Additionally, the Scranton Yeshiva has a dual basketball court.

References 

Educational institutions established in 1964
Orthodox yeshivas in the United States
1964 establishments in Pennsylvania